Aleksandr Gennadyevich Agapov (born 7 February 1982) is a former Russian professional footballer.

Club career
He played 8 seasons in the Russian Football National League for 5 different clubs.

Honours
 Russian Second Division, Zone South best goalkeeper: 2010.

References

External links
 

1982 births
Living people
People from Maykop
Russian footballers
Association football goalkeepers
FC Neftekhimik Nizhnekamsk players
FC Fakel Voronezh players
RSK Dižvanagi players
FC Dynamo Stavropol players
FC Chernomorets Novorossiysk players
FC Mordovia Saransk players
FC SKA-Khabarovsk players
FC KAMAZ Naberezhnye Chelny players
Latvian Higher League players
Russian expatriate footballers
Expatriate footballers in Latvia
Russian expatriate sportspeople in Latvia
FC Mashuk-KMV Pyatigorsk players
Sportspeople from Adygea